Cratendune is the name of the lost village reported in the Liber Eliensis, the history of the abbey, then Ely Cathedral, compiled towards the end of the 12th century, as the 500th anniversary of the traditional founding date drew near. As no direction is indicated in Liber Eliensis, a number of archaeological sites are therefore candidates for this lost village.

History 
Reading from the Liber Eliensis MS folio 2, which is a 12th  century Benedictine history of Ely written in Latin, Bentham describes Æthelberht of Kent, Chief of the Saxon Kings, founding a church at the insistence of Augustine (died 26  May 604). The date mentioned for this founding was the year 607, three years after Augustine's death. This incongruity was attributed by Bentham to a mistake by the monk transcribing this history.

Fairweather, translating the same Latin text, records the site  from the present site of the Cathedral:In times of old, so it is said, there was a vill, that is, in Latin, Vallis Cracti a mile away from the city which now exists. There one frequently finds implements of iron-work and the coinage of past kings, and the fact that it was for a long time a place inhabited by men is clear from various pieces of evidence. But after Æthelthryth, beloved of God, chose to dwell there, ...she sited her living-quarters near the course of the river, on higher ground

Staffed by Benedictine monks, the church was abandoned, perhaps destroyed in around 650 by or on the orders of the pagan Penda of Mercia.

No direction is indicated in Liber Eliensis; a number of archaeological sites, therefore, are candidates for this lost village. Two candidate locations are based on the survival of the toponym Cratenden. One, Cratendon Field, was identified as the lost site by the antiquarian James Bentham just south of the city of Ely, and the identification was repeated by James Sargant Storer, in The Antiquarian Itinerary, 1816. Janet Fairweather notes that in the Ely Coucher book Cratendune Field is listed next to Grunty Fen, corroborating this identification. Cratendune also survived as a toponym associated with Chettisham in a 1251 survey.

Geography 
As there is no documented direction for Cratendune, the place could be anywhere. These modern places are all within  of the present day site of Ely cathedral.

Archaeology 
The search for Cratendune continues, though evidence that any one site is the lost village remains sparse. In 1999 there was media attention during preparation work for new buildings at West Fen Road, Ely. The archaeology work subsequently undertaken indeed shows Romano-British and Anglo-Saxon occupation. However, it was shown that the site was still active in the 13th century and there were no signs of an earlier Anglo-Saxon settlement here. This makes the West Fen Road site an unlikely Cratendune location.

During World War II whilst constructing an aerodrome at Witchford, near Little Thetford, a cemetery was discovered. Major Gordon Fowler reports witnessing a bulldozer leveling off ground and in so doing was crushing skeletons. The urgent war effort could not be stopped so little archaeological work could be undertaken. He was, however, able to recover some objects from the graves, which were later dated by Lethbridge to be consistent with the period AD 450–650. Recent survey work has not repeated the 1943 report of an Anglo-Saxon cemetery here, instead of finding Iron-Age and Roman period domestic and other remains. It has been suggested that an Anglo-Saxon settlement within Ely was perhaps more spread out, is no single core settlement.

See also 
 Anglo-Saxon England
 Anglo-Saxon settlement of Britain

References

Footnotes

Notes

Bibliography

Further reading

External links 
 Cratendune Controversy
 

 Former populated places in Cambridgeshire